Essington Hall Farmhouse is a grade II listed building in Essington, Staffordshire.

See also
Listed buildings in Essington

References

Grade II listed buildings in Staffordshire